Crow foot, crow's foot, crow's feet or crowfoot may refer to:

People
 Crowfoot (1830–1890), First Nations chief, of the Blackfoot
 Crow Foot (1873–1890), Native American of the Sioux
 John Winter Crowfoot (1873–1959), British archaeologist
 Bert Crowfoot (born 1954), Canadian journalist, photographer and television producer

Places
 Crowfoot, New Jersey, an unincorporated community, US

Canada
 Crowfoot Mountain (Alberta), Canadian Rockies, Alberta
 Crowfoot Glacier
 Crowfoot (electoral district), an electoral district in Alberta
 Crowfoot station, a light rail station in Calgary, Alberta

Science and technology
 Crow's foot notation, a set of symbols used to show relationships in a relational database management system
 Crowfoot wrench
 Crow's feet, a name for wrinkles in the outer corner of the eyes resulting from aging

Plants

 Cranesbill, or wild geranium
 Cardamine concatenata, crow's foot toothwort
 Eleusine indica, crow's foot grass
 Erodium spp.
 Crow's foot violet, two species of violets; See List of Viola species
 Water crowfoot, several Ranunculus species
 Diphasiastrum digitatum, crowsfoot

Other uses
 Crowfoot (band), a 1970s-era California-based rock band
 Crow's-foot stitch, a kind of embroidery stitch
 Caltrop, an archaic anti-personnel weapon
 Broad arrow or pheon, a marker for government property
 Algiz or Elhaz, a Proto-Germanic rune

See also
 Bird's Foot (disambiguation)

 Chicken foot (disambiguation)
 Chicken claw (disambiguation)